Pëllumb Kulla (born 1940) is a former Albanian diplomat and author. He served as Permanent Representative of Albania to the United Nations from 1993 to 1997.

Biography
Kulla was born in the village of Zemblak, Albania. He wrote plays and books.

Kulla served as Permanent Representative of Albania to the United Nations from 1993 to 1997.

References 

1940 births
Living people
Permanent Representatives of Albania to the United Nations
People from Korçë County
Albanian male writers
20th-century Albanian writers
Albanian dramatists and playwrights
20th-century dramatists and playwrights
20th-century male writers
Male dramatists and playwrights